The 1st constituency of Loire is one of six French legislative constituencies in the Loire department, in the Auvergne-Rhône-Alpes region.

It consists of the (pre-2014 cantonal re-organisation) cantons of
Saint Étienne North-East 1 and 2 and Saint Étienne North-West 1 and 2.
Its population was 111,405 at the 1999 census.

Deputies

Election Results

2022

 
 
|-
| colspan="8" bgcolor="#E9E9E9"|
|-
 
 

 
 
 
 
 * Courbon stood as a dissident PS member, without the support of the NUPES alliance, of which PS is a member. As PS were in alliance with all NUPES candidates, the PS results from 2017 are included in swing calculations for the NUPES candidate in both rounds.

2017

2012

References

1